The FIM Hard Enduro World Championship is the championship series for Hard Enduro a variant of Enduro off-road motorcycle racing. It began as the World Enduro Super Series (WESS) in 2018, before gaining FIM World Championship status and being renamed to the FIM Hard Enduro World Championship for 2021

It is one of the most challenging and brutal forms of motorcycling racing. The "track" is made up of natural or artificial elements (earth, sand, etc.), on which are found various, mainly natural, “obstacles” (hillclimbs, stones, tree trunks, stretches of water, etc.)

History 
The Championship began in 2018 as the World Enduro Super Series (WESS), its aim to form the most encompassing and true Enduro championship to date. Bringing together all disciplines of Enduro – Hard Enduro, Classic Enduro, Cross-Country and Beach Racing.

Billy Bolt won in inaugural 2018 season. 

The 2020 season was cancelled due to the COVID-19 pandemic.

The 2021 championship was won by Billy Bolt with the result going down to the last event of the season.

Championship

Classes 
There are no specific classes in FIM Hard Enduro, riders may compete on any bike that complies with the FIM Hard Enduro Technical Regulations.

Events 

 2023

  GetzenRodeo (2019, 2021, 2023)
  Erzberg Rodeo (2018-2019, 2022-2023)
  Red Bull Abestone (2021-2023)
  Red Bull Outliers (2022-2023)
  Red Bull Romaniacs (2018-2019, 2021-2023)
  Roof of Africa (2023)
  Xross Hard Enduro Rally (2022-2023)

 Former

  BR2 Enduro Solsona (2019)
  Extreme XL Lagares (2018-2019, 2021)
  Gotland Grand National (2018)
  Hawkstone Park Cross-Country (2018-2019)
  Hixpania Hard Enduro (2019, 2021-2022)
  Minus 400 (2022)
  Red Bull 111 Megawatt / Hero Challenge (2018, 2021)
  Red Bull Knock Out (2018)
  Red Bull TKO (2021-2022)
  Trèfle Lozérien (2018-2019)

Points system 
While pros and amateurs compete in Hard Enduro, only pros with FIM licences can score World Championship points, these are awarded as follows:

If the championship ends in a tie on points, the winner is decided by the majority of best placings.

Medalists
 2018-19: World Enduro Super Series
 2021-current: FIM Hard Enduro World Championship

References

External links 
 Fédération Internationale de Motocyclismo (FIM) – World governing body

Motorcycle off-road racing series
World motorcycle racing series
Fédération Internationale de Motocyclisme